The 1882 California gubernatorial election was held on November 7, 1882, to elect the governor of California.

Results

References

1882
California
gubernatorial
November 1882 events